Ireland was present at the Eurovision Song Contest 1986, held in Bergen, Norway.

Before Eurovision

National Song Contest 1986 
The final was held on 30 March 1986 at the Radio Telefís Éireann Studios in Dublin, and was hosted by radio and television presenter Mike Murphy. Eleven regional juries across Ireland selected the winning song, "You Can Count on Me", performed by the group Luv Bug and composed by Kevin Sheerin.

At Eurovision
Luv Bug performed twelfth on the night of the contest, following Israel and preceding Belgium. At the close of the voting the song had received 96 points, placing 4th in a field of 20 competing countries. This high placing was the third of five straight top ten finishes, and was the run-up to Ireland's win in Brussels the next year.

Voting

References

External links
Irish National Final 1986

1986
Countries in the Eurovision Song Contest 1986
Eurovision
Eurovision